Çaykirpi is a village in the Taşköprü District of Kastamonu Province, Turkey. Its population is 150 (2022).

Culture 
Çaykirpi has a festival celebrating halva. The halva festival comes from its ancient traditions. The village has its own specific dishes such as a meal prepared from goose meat, pilaf with duck meat, and food prepared from okra.

Geography 
The distances from the cities of Kastamonu and Taşköprü are 49 km and 7 km, respectively. The effect of Black Sea on the climate of the village is considerably high.

Population 
The table below shows the number of people living in the village in select year.

Infrastructure 
The village has a primary school, a drinking water network, and a sewer system. There is no hospital.

References 

Villages in Taşköprü District